State of Drama is a Swedish pop/rock band formed in 2009 by lead singer Emil Gullhamn, drummer Sebastian Hallifax, bass John Isaksson, guitar Rickard Olausson and keyboard Stefan Koro.

The group took part in "Svensktoppen nästa", a music competition organized by Swedish Radio P4, to search for new talents. The band finished at second place with their song "Maybe". The song was played with frequent rotation on radio and was a chart success.
In spring 2012, State of Drama took part in yet another music competition, called Metro on Stage, with the song "Can't Find You Anywhere". Winning approximately a thousand votes in the first round, they reached the finals and eventually won the title. The prize was a marketing deal worth 3.5 million SEK.

About six months after winning Metro on Stage, the band participated in "Melodifestivalen" 2013, the Swedish race to the great Eurovision Song Contest. They competed with the song "Falling" in a bid to represent Sweden on semi-final, finishing 2nd place and qualifying straight to the final, where they finished in 9th place.
They released their debut album Fighter in March 2013, just days before the Melodifestivalen final. The album includes their earlier hits "Maybe" and "Can't Find You Anywhere”. 
On the week preceding the final, their song "Falling" entered "Sverigetopplistan", the official Swedish Singles Chart, as number 16.
Falling is played frequently on Spotify with almost 6 million streams. The popularity led to "Falling" earning a gold record. "Falling" became the second most played song on Swedish radio in 2013.

They appeared again in the Melodifestivalen 2014 with the song "All We Are".

In spring 2015, the album "Pre & Post Us” was released, followed by TV performances and gigs throughout Sweden.

State of Drama has been nominated for the prestigious award "Rockbjörnen" in the category best live act (2013 & 2014).

"Drown Clubmix", State of Drama´s first club mix ever, was released in US in the summer of 2015. It is produced by the Grammy nominated DJ and producer, Mike Rizzo from New York.

The band is signed in Scandinavia with Universal Music Sweden, but is currently unsigned for the rest of the world.

Discography

Studio albums

Extended plays

Singles

References

External links
Official website
Facebook page
Spotify Page
Instagram Page
Youtube Page

Swedish musical groups
Melodifestivalen contestants of 2014
Melodifestivalen contestants of 2013